Pierre de Montaut (28 June 1892 – 18 August 1974) was a French sailor who competed in the 1936 Summer Olympics.

References

1892 births
1974 deaths
French male sailors (sport)
Olympic sailors of France
Sailors at the 1936 Summer Olympics – Star